Télesphore Fournier,  (August 5, 1823 – May 10, 1896) was a Canadian politician, lawyer, and judge of the Supreme Court of Canada.

Born in Saint-François-de-la-Rivière-du-Sud, Lower Canada (now Quebec), the son of Guillaume Fournier and Marie-Archange Morin, he was called to the bar in 1846. On July 22, 1857, he married Hermine-Eloïse Demers, and they had nine children: seven daughters and two sons.

From 1855 to 1859, he was the co-owner and co-editor of the newspaper, Le National de Québec.

In an 1870 by-election, he was acclaimed as a Liberal Member of Parliament in the riding of Bellechasse. He was re-elected in 1872, 1873, and 1875. He held three ministerial positions: Minister of Inland Revenue (1873–1874), Minister of Justice and Attorney General of Canada (1874–1875), and Postmaster General (1875). He tabled the bill to create the Supreme Court of Canada in February 1875.

At that period of time, it was possible to be a Member of Parliament and a Member of the Legislative Assembly of the Province of Quebec (pre-1968 designation of the (Quebec National Assembly) (MLA). He was an MLA in the riding of Montmagny from 1871 to 1873.

He was appointed as one of the first judges of the Supreme Court of Canada on September 30, 1875. Four years later, his wife died, and his eldest daughter then kept house. He retired on September 12, 1895, and died on May 10, 1896, at the age of 72.

The house he lived in from 1877 until 1882 is now the Embassy of the Republic of Croatia in Ottawa.

Electoral record

References 
 
 Supreme Court of Canada Biography
 
 
 February 1875 House of Commons Debates on the 1875 Statute purporting to Establish the Supreme Court of Canada, excerpted from Debates of the House of Commons of the Dominion of Canada. Reported and Edited by A.M. Burgess, Vol. I.--Session 1875. Ottawa. Printed by C. W. Mitchell, "Free Press" Office, Elgin Street. 1875.
 "GeneaNET - Télesphore Fournier"

1823 births
1896 deaths
Postmasters General of Canada
Justices of the Supreme Court of Canada
Liberal Party of Canada MPs
Members of the House of Commons of Canada from Quebec
Members of the King's Privy Council for Canada
Quebec Liberal Party MNAs
Lawyers in Quebec
French Quebecers